The 1972 United States presidential election in Alaska took place on November 7, 1972, as part of the 1972 United States presidential election. Voters chose three representatives, or electors to the Electoral College, who voted for president and vice president.

Alaska was won by incumbent President Richard Nixon (R-California) with 58.1% of the popular vote against  George McGovern (D-South Dakota) with 34.6%. Although Alaska has only voted Democratic once, which was for Lyndon B. Johnson in 1964, during the state's first four presidential elections Alaska was no more Republican than the nation at-large: indeed owing to a fairly strong third-party campaign Nixon won 2.57 percent less of the vote in Alaska that over the entire country, although McGovern received 2.88 percent less than his national share. Nonetheless, Alaska weighed in for this election as 0.3% more Democratic than the nation-at-large. McGovern won small majorities in Kusilvak and Bethel Census Areas, and the Democrats also received a plurality in North Slope Borough. Elsewhere, Nixon carried every borough and census area, with as typical the Republicans’ most dominant showings being in the relatively heavily populated areas around Anchorage and Matanuska-Susitna Borough.

Nixon ultimately won the national vote as well, defeating McGovern and winning re-election. Representative John G. Schmitz (R-California) ran under the American Independent Party ticket. While Alaska would prove to be Schmitz's second strongest state after Idaho, he failed to equal the success of George Wallace’s campaign in the previous election. This is the one and only time that Alaska voted to the left of Hawaii.

Results

See also
United States presidential elections in Alaska

References

Alaska
1972
1972 Alaska elections